The James Boyter House, at 90 W. 200 North in Beaver, Utah, was built in 1883.  It was listed on the National Register of Historic Places in 1983.

It is a -story house with three dormer windows.

It was built by James Boyter, a stonemason.

See also
James Boyter Shop, at 50 W. 200 North, also National Register-listed

References

National Register of Historic Places in Beaver County, Utah
Houses completed in 1883